The Well is a 1951 American drama film directed by Leo C. Popkin and Russell Rouse and starring Richard Rober and Maidie Norman. It tackles the issue of racial tensions and collective behavior. Produced on a modest budget with a cast made up largely of unknown actors, it was nominated for two Academy Awards, including Best Original Screenplay and Best Film Editing.

Plot
The plot centers around the disappearance of Carolyn, a five-year-old black girl who falls into an abandoned, overgrown well while picking flowers on her way to school one morning. Her parents seek assistance from Sheriff Ben Kellogg (Richard Rober) to help find her. Carolyn's disappearance causes anger and confusion in the community, and various rumors quickly spread among the white and black populations when a white stranger, Claude Packard (Harry Morgan), is arrested on suspicion of having something to do with it.

Claude, a mining engineer, is in town visiting his uncle, Sam Packard (Barry Kelley), a well-known local businessman, who attempts to use his influence to get his nephew out of police custody. This inflames the racial tension further, and when Sam is accosted by Carolyn's relatives outside the police station, he suffers a heart attack, which is reported among the white population as a racial attack. Things quickly get out of hand as various gangs of black and white residents start attacking one another. The sheriff requests that the mayor order state assistance to put down the potentially serious disturbances and readies voluntary deputies to break up the growing white mob at Sam's warehouse.

Before events can spiral completely out of control, Carolyn is found alive in the well but can't be easily extracted. It takes the efforts of Sam's construction crew to sink a parallel shaft, and engineer Claude, to safely rescue her and return her to her family.

Cast

 Richard Rober as Sheriff Ben Kellogg
 Gwendolyn Laster as Carolyn Crawford
 Maidie Norman as Martha Crawford
 Barry Kelley as Sam Packard (as Barry Kelly)
 Harry Morgan as Claude Packard
 Tom Powers as the Mayor
 Robert Osterloh as Wylie
 Christine Larson as Casey
 George Hamilton as Grandpa Peabody
 Ernest Anderson as Ralph Crawford
 Dick Simmons as Deputy Mickey McClure

Production

Development
The film was developed under the working title Deep is the Well. The script was based on the real-life case of Kathy Fiscus, who fell into a pipe in an abandoned oil field in 1949 and died before she could be rescued. Billy Wilder was reportedly interested in bringing the story to the screen, but producer Harry M. Popkin sought to do it first. Wilder went on to make Ace in the Hole (1951), which centers on the rescue of a man trapped in a cave; the 1950 film Three Secrets was also inspired by the Fiscus incident.

The script writers researched and incorporated factual material from race riots that had broken out in American cities, such as the 1943 Detroit race riot which claimed 34 lives.

According to the Chicago Tribune, the film was the first successful screenwriting effort for Russell Rouse and Clarence Greene, as they were involved all the way through the production, lending their talents to direction as well.

Casting
The film, produced on a modest budget of $450,000, largely featured unknown actors, with the exception of Richard Rober, Tom Powers, and Barry Kelly. This was the first leading role for Rober, a former stage actor who came to Hollywood in 1947 and appeared in a succession of B-movies and film noir-type films. The Well was also the only leading role for actress Maidie Norman, who played the little girl's mother.

Filming 
Location filming took place in Marysville and Grass Valley, California, with studio sets at the Motion Picture Center Studio in Hollywood.

Release
The Well was released in the United States on September 10, 1951. Its planned premiere in Cincinnati in October 1951 was delayed when the Ohio Film Censor Board informed the distributor, United Artists, that its deliberations were ongoing due to "the presence of Negro characters in the plot". The Ohio Film Censor Board finally approved the film in February 1952.

Reception

Critical response
Variety praised the film for its "high drama and suspense". It credited the screenwriters for adapting the Kathy Fiscus case and changing the race of the girl to Negro, calling this decision "unusually well handled". The review also commended the cast as being "uniformly strong". The Philadelphia Inquirer review noted that the film, which it called "[t]ersely written, unflinchingly directed, expertly played by a cast boasting no 'big' names ... underscores the value of an independent producer".

Writing for The New York Times, film critic Bosley Crowther also praised the production, writing: "A taut and absorbing exposition of human compassion and energy brought to bear upon a critical job of rescuing a little girl from an abandoned well impels to a pulse-quickening climax a middling social drama". He also praised the "third-string cast which stands up to some powerful pounding". However, Crowther noted that the sudden onset of racial tensions in a town that purportedly never had any trouble between blacks and whites before strained credibility: "Prejudice and antagonism are arbitrarily and recklessly assumed and portrayed in a manner which appears less calculated to understand society than to create an effect. And then, when it is discovered that the missing child is at the bottom of an abandoned well, the authors have swiftly relaxed the racial tension just as arbitrarily as they have turned it on".

The Detroit Free Press review notes the "[u]nique use of machinery for dramatic effect", overlaid by Dmitri Tiomkin's pounding musical score, as the workers sink the rescue shaft. This review also credited the use of unknown actors and ordinary citizens in the final scenes to provide "realistic power". The operators of the heavy equipment were all equipment operators by profession, while residents of the town in which the final scenes were filmed were employed as extras in the large crowd.

Time Out commended the first half of the film for its depiction of race relations in a small town, but regarding the second half, in which blacks and whites come together to await the child's rescue, it stated: "It still grips, but in a more overtly crowd-pleasing way". The review also singled out Ernest Laszlo's "brilliant" cinematography.

Writing in 2020, critic Craig Butler believes the film's social message holds up by modern-day standards. He wrote: "Although modern audiences are likely to find The Well somewhat dated, it actually holds up much better than many other 'socially conscious' films of the period (or of many other periods, for that matter)." He also discussed the casting: "The cast includes some professionals (such as a very good Harry Morgan) but also a number of non-pros; the latter may lack polish, but there's an energy to their work that is appropriate to the project".

Accolades
Nominations
 Academy Awards: Best Film Editing - Chester W. Schaeffer; Best Original Screenplay - Clarence Greene and Russell Rouse; 1952. 
 Golden Globes: Best Motion Picture Score - Dimitri Tiomkin; 1952.  
 Writers Guild of America: The Robert Meltzer Award (Screenplay Dealing Most Ably with Problems of the American Scene) - Russell Rouse and Clarence Greene; 1952.

The film was named best picture of the year by the PittsC, an African-American newspaper. It also won a special midseason citation from the Foreign Language Press Film Critics Circle.

DVD
The film was released to DVD by Image Entertainment on February 20, 2007 as a Region 1 fullscreen DVD.

Notes

References

External links
 
 
 
 
 
 The Well information site and DVD review at DVD Beaver (includes images)

1951 films
1951 directorial debut films
1951 drama films
1950s thriller drama films
American black-and-white films
American films based on actual events
American thriller drama films
Film noir
Films about race and ethnicity
Films about racism
Films directed by Russell Rouse
Films scored by Dimitri Tiomkin
United Artists films
1950s English-language films
1950s American films